Tigers is a 5-song EP released by the Washington, DC rock band The Dance Party. It was initially intended to be released on July 14, 2009; however, only a limited number of EP's were pressed and were made available only at live shows due to contractual obligations with Atlantic Records.

The Dance Party announced on November 14, 2011 that a full, ten-song version of Tigers would be released on December 23, 2011.

Tigers was produced and mixed by Andros Rodriguez. Mike Tasevoli of The Hard Tomorrows played drums on the record.

Track listing

References

External links
 Tigers from The Dance Party Merch Store

2009 albums